Night Caller from Outer Space, also known as simply The Night Caller or Blood Beast from Outer Space, is a British 1965 science fiction film directed by John Gilling. It is based on Frank Crisp's novel The Night Callers.  A colourised version of the film was released in 2011.

Plot

Scientist Dr Morley and his American associate Jack Costain (John Saxon) detect a meteorite heading to Earth. After determining where the meteorite has crashed, they and their aides investigate a meteorite in the British countryside, discovering that it is an alien device from Ganymede, a moon of Jupiter. The device is in the shape of a small sphere.

While working nights at the lab, secretary Ann Barlow (Patricia Haines) sees something moving in the lab. Dr Morley attempts to communicate with the creature, but he is killed. The creature escapes the lab. Costain begins to track the creature.

Shortly thereafter, teenage girls begin to go missing after answering an advertisement in 'Bikini Girl' magazine. It turns out the alien wants to use women from Earth for breeding purposes.

Cast
 John Saxon as Dr. Jack Costain 
 Maurice Denham as Dr. Morley 
 Patricia Haines as Ann Barlow 
 Alfred Burke as Detective Supt. Hartley 
 John Carson as the Major
 Warren Mitchell as Reg Lilburn 
 Marianne Stone as Madge Lilburn
 Stanley Meadows as Det. Tom Grant 
 Aubrey Morris as Thorburn 
 Ballard Berkeley as Cmdr. Savage  
 Geoffrey Lumsden as Colonel Davy
 Tom Gill as Police Commissioner's secretary
 Jack Watson as Sergeant Hawkins
 Barbara French as Joyce Malone

Production
It was the first science fiction film from John Saxon. Directed by John Gilling. UK prints of the film feature Alan Haven's version of the hit instrumental "Image" as the theme played over the opening credits. Export prints feature a lounge number titled "The Night Caller" written by Albert Hague and sung by Mark Richardson.

Reception

In a contemporary review, "Byro." of Variety declared that "it is simply too well-made for its own commercial good" and that it was "far above average of its kind, but it eschews a standard action-adventure climax in favor of a "philosophical" one." "Byro." noted that audiences at a 42nd street screening showed their displeasure with the film "quite volubly".

Leonard Maltin called it a "well-done sci-fi thriller" and gave it two-and-a-half stars out of four.

Moira found the first of half of the movie to be well done, but that the film fails in the second half.

Creature Feature gave the movie 2 out of 5 stars, liking the direction.

TV Guide gave the movie 2 out of five stars, finding both the script and production values worthwhile.

Home release

Released on DVD in 22 December. 2011

References

External links 
 

1965 films
British science fiction films
British black-and-white films
1960s science fiction films
Films set in England
Films directed by John Gilling
Films based on British novels
1960s English-language films
1960s British films